Are You Being Served? is a British sitcom created and written by executive producer David Croft (Croft also directed some episodes) and Jeremy Lloyd, with contributions from Michael Knowles and John Chapman, for the BBC. Set in London, the show follows the misadventures and mishaps of the staff of the retail ladies' and gentlemen's clothing departments in the flagship department store of a fictional chain called Grace Brothers.

The series was broadcast on the BBC for ten series, totalling 69 episodes between 8 September 1972 and 1 April 1985 – and included five Christmas specials. There was also a 1977 film, a spin-off series Grace & Favour with the same main cast in 1991–1992, and a one-off episode with a new cast in 2016. Since its original release, all 69 episodes, the pilot, the Christmas specials, the sequel and the film have been released on DVD.

Are You Being Served? was a success in the UK audience ratings. The series was screened in Canada, New Zealand, Australia and the Republic of Ireland, and was aired in the Netherlands and Belgium with Dutch subtitles. The show was also broadcast in Israel and in the United States, where it gained a loyal following when PBS television stations began airing reruns of it in the mid-1980s, along with other British sitcoms. In 2004, it was ranked 20th in a television countdown of Britain's Best Sitcom. It is regularly rebroadcast in the English-speaking world.

Production

Programme conception
The idea for the show came from Lloyd's brief period in the early 1950s working at Simpsons of Piccadilly, a clothing store which traded for over 60 years until its closing in 1999. The inspiration for the store has also been credited to the former Clements of Watford where the concept of the floor walker character Captain Peacock was devised.

Airing

The pilot episode was created as part of the Comedy Playhouse series, although the BBC had originally chosen not to broadcast the programme. The pilot was used as a filler during the 1972 Summer Olympics when the coverage of the games was interrupted by the Munich massacre on 8 September 1972, leading to a full series being produced. The pilot episode was repeated before the first series began, on 14 March 1973. Although the first series was aired in the same timeslot as Coronation Street on ITV, consequently receiving relatively little attention, the repeats shown later in the year were much more successful.

The show became a ratings hit and, after a successful 13-year run, Are You Being Served? came to an end on 1 April 1985.

Of the original cast, only Frank Thornton, Mollie Sugden, John Inman, Wendy Richard and Nicholas Smith appeared in all 69 episodes. The same five later featured in the sequel sitcom, Grace & Favour (also known as Are You Being Served? Again!). The cast performed in character for a stage sketch on the BBC1 programme Variety on 19 June 1976.

Restoration of the 1972 pilot
Although the pilot was produced in colour, the videotape was wiped in the 1970s, leaving only a 16mm black-and-white film telerecording, which was made for international syndication to countries where colour television broadcasts had not been adopted. In 2009, the pilot episode was restored to colour using the colour recovery technique previously used for the Dad's Army episode "Room at the Bottom". The restored colour version was first shown on BBC2 on 1 January 2010 as part of a special Are You Being Served? night. As of 2023, the colour version has yet to be released on DVD or Blu Ray.

Theme song
Audio samples of Are You Being Served? (media help)
The theme song, written by the show's co-writer David Croft and composer Ronnie Hazlehurst, consists of an imaginary lift girl, voiced by Stephanie Gathercole, also Mr Rumbold's first secretary, (r.n. Reeve), (1944-2011), announcing each floor over the musique concrète sounds of a cash register (which effectively serves as the only percussion instrument) and a simple musical accompaniment.

The 1977 Are You Being Served? film has a different version of the theme song which is longer, in a different key and without the floor announcements. A remix of the theme was released in 1996 by a dance act calling itself "Grace Brothers", and featured vocal samples of John Inman and Frank Thornton.

There is a homage to the theme song in the Ladytron song "Paco!" from the album 604, and New Zealand band Minuit's "I hate guns". A lugubrious version of the theme song is featured on the album The Ape of Naples by the experimental music group Coil. The theme song has also been covered by Australian band Regurgitator on their 1999 album ...art. Pop singer Jamelia's song "Window Shopping" (from her 2006 album Walk with Me) begins with a sample of the familiar cash register sound effect as well as Mrs Slocombe's voice inquiring, "Good morning, Mr Grainger; are you free?"

The song was also used in a 2016 Audi advertisement for their Quattro range.

International broadcasts

The series was shown in the United States on PBS stations and on BBC America, as well as in many Commonwealth nations around the world. PBS first began airing it (on 24 stations) in 1987, and viewership steadily climbed as more stations carried it. By the early 1990s, it had gained such a loyal following that American viewers of the show formed fan clubs and were in large attendance wherever cast members made guest appearances.

Are You Being Served? aired in Canada in prime time on Global Television Network in the mid 1980s and late night on YTV. The show aired on Saturday evening prime time from the mid 1980s to late 1990s. It was also available to Canadian viewers from most border PBS stations in the United States.

The series was successfully screened in Australia. It began on ABC Television in 1974 and was repeated by ABC in Australia several times. By 1978, the rights to early episodes had been acquired by the commercial Seven Network who gained a larger audience than it had received on the ABC. Are You Being Served? was ranked as the top-rated show on Australian television for 1978, being watched by 2,255,000 people in five cities. New episodes were aired on ABC until 1984. After that, the last series was broadcast on the Seven Network.

The entire series was screened in New Zealand on TVNZ.

Characters and casting

Are You Being Served? featured humour based on sexual innuendo, misunderstanding, mistaken identity, farce, and occasional slapstick. In addition, there were sight gags generated by outrageous costumes which the characters were sometimes required to wear for store promotions, and gaudy store displays sometimes featuring malfunctioning robotic mannequins. The show is remembered for its prolific use of double entendres.

A key humorous base of the series was a parody of the British class system. This permeated a range of relationships and interactions, such as conversations between the maintenance men and sales personnel, or between sales staff and management. The episodes rarely featured locations outside the store. Characters rarely addressed each other by their first names, even after work, instead using their titles (commonly Mr, Mrs, Miss, or Captain).

Original main cast 
Mr Wilberforce Claybourne Humphries (John Inman), a sales assistant in gents'; a camp-acting man who lives with his mother, also played on several occasions by Inman. He made frequent use of double entendre, especially related to his implied gay lifestyle. (After the first five episodes, a senior BBC executive ordered David Croft to "Get rid of the poof". Croft declined, saying: "If the poof goes, I go.") The character was played by actor Jason Watkins in the 2016 revival.
Mrs Betty Slocombe (Mollie Sugden), a senior sales assistant and head of the ladies' department. She is known for her changing hair colour and telling double entendre stories about her cat Tiddles, which she refers to as "my pussy". Although usually called by her first name Betty, in one episode she is referred to as Rachel, one of her middle names. 
Miss Shirley Brahms (Wendy Richard), a young, attractive, working-class, cockney-speaking junior sales assistant to Mrs Slocombe.
Captain Stephen Peacock (Frank Thornton), the haughty floorwalker who purportedly fought in the North Africa Campaign of World War II (and in the Pacific theatre) but was accused of actually being a corporal in the Service Corps and never seeing combat.
 Mr Cuthbert Rumbold (Nicholas Smith), the autocratic, obsequious (to the Grace brothers), yet bumbling and incompetent floor manager.
 Mr James/Dick Lucas (Trevor Bannister) (series 1–7), the young, penniless, womanising junior salesman; a source of irritation to the female sales staff. Always referred to as the department 'junior', but Bannister was one year older than Inman. The character left the series after Series 7 (1979), due to Bannister's prior commitments.  His character leaving within the show was not mentioned or referenced. Wendy Richard claimed in an interview that the series was originally devised as a vehicle for Trevor Bannister.
 Mr Ernest Grainger (Arthur Brough) (series 1–5), a 40-year veteran of Grace Brothers, a senior sales assistant and head of the gents' department, who often falls asleep on the job, is usually grumpy, and wears a measuring tape over his shoulders. Arthur Brough died before the filming of Series 6. The character of Mr Grainger was brought back for the 2016 revival with Roy Barraclough replacing Arthur Brough. 
 "Young" Mr Grace (Harold Bennett) (series 1–8), the very old, rich but stingy store owner, surrounded by attractive young women. The character's final appearance was in 1981 following Bennett's death. The character was killed off in the first episode of the spinoff series Grace & Favour.
 Mr Mash (Larry Martyn) (series 1–3), the stock and maintenance man who installed mechanised display units in store and was often scolded by Captain Peacock for being on the floor during opening hours.  There was no mention of his character leaving Grace Brothers or being transferred.

Subsequent main cast 
 Diana Yardswick (Doremy Vernon) (series 3–4, 6–10), the manageress of Grace Brothers' canteen at which the staff had their lunch. Known for serving grossly unappetising food, and for her ill temper and sarcasm, as well as for enforcing strict social order, which dictated that management, sales staff and the maintenance crew and lift operators all dine separately. Initially a minor character, she gradually increased in prominence as the series progressed.
 Mr Beverley Harman (Arthur English) (series 4–10), Mr Mash's replacement. Although he holds the same position as his predecessor, the staff have a more friendly relationship with him than they did with Mr Mash. Mr Rumbold calls him Harry in series 5, but in series 9 he states his name is actually Beverley.
 Mr Percival Tebbs (James Hayter) (series 6), Mr Grainger's replacement. He retired after only one year in the men's department, and his departure paves the way for Mr Goldberg's arrival in the next series.
 Mr Harry Goldberg (Alfie Bass) (series 7), Mr Tebbs's replacement. Originally the junior salesman, he was quickly promoted to senior after proving to be a master salesman. Like Tebbs, Goldberg lasted only one year.
 Mr Bert Spooner (Mike Berry) (series 8–10), eventually replaced Mr Lucas as gents' junior sales assistant and was similar to him in many ways.
 "Old" Mr Grace (Kenneth Waller) (series 8), "Young" Mr Grace's even-older brother – replaced him at the store when he took a sabbatical to write his memoirs. Unlike Harold Bennett, who was of an age with his character, Waller was aged-up with makeup for the role, as he was only 54 at the time.  The character of Old Mr. Grace lasted only one series; in the final two series, the management of the store was attributed only to “Mr. Grace” without further specification, and the character was unseen in this period.
 Mr Grossman (Milo Sperber) (series 8), an expert shoe salesman, joined the gents' department, when some of the floor space was given over to shoes. He lasted only four episodes.
 Mr Abraham Klein (Benny Lee) (series 8), joined the gents' department to help out with upcoming sales in the store. Klein lasted only four episodes.
 Miss Belfridge (Candy Davis) (series 9–10), the last and longest-running of Mr Rumbold's secretaries. She was admired by all male staff, including Mr Humphries and especially Captain Peacock, who dined her at The Ritz Hotel.

Episodes

Are You Being Served? was initially broadcast from 1973 to 1985. Each series had between five and nine episodes. Counting the pilot episode, all episodes and specials from the series, and the film, the show ran for sixty-nine episodes and ten series. Each episode was self-contained, with no continuing story or theme throughout the series.

Film

In 1977, as for many other British sitcoms of the time, a feature film was released. The film version of Are You Being Served? followed the staff of Grace Brothers taking a package holiday together while the store is closed for redecoration, a loose adaptation of the play version from the year before. Set in the fictional resort of Costa Plonka, in Spain, the entire cast of the television series reprised their roles in the film. Reviews of the film were generally mixed, with the Monthly Film Bulletin reviewer John Pym declaring, "The humour consists mainly of withering selection of patent British puns; an inflatable brassiere, some let's-insult-the-Germans jokes and a rickey thunder-box which bolts from the outside are thrown in for good measure."

The Best of Are You Being Served? (1992)
Buoyed by the huge success of the series in the United States, BBC America commissioned a special straight-to-VHS compilation in 1992. Running at 78 minutes, The Best of Are You Being Served featured newly-shot scenes of Mr Humphries reminiscing with his elderly mother, Annie, about his time working at Grace Brothers. Both roles were played by John Inman. The additional sequences were filmed in America, and directed by Don Hopfer.

2016 revival
In 2016, a one-off revival episode was announced and filmed at dock10 studios. It was broadcast as part of BBC's Landmark Sitcom Season, a celebration of 60 years of television sitcoms. It was set in 1988 with the original characters, played by a new cast.

Former Only Fools and Horses actor John Challis portrayed Captain Peacock; former Coronation Street actors Sherrie Hewson and Roy Barraclough  were cast as Mrs Slocombe and Mr Grainger respectively, and comedian Arthur Smith as Mr Harman. Mr Humphries was portrayed by Jason Watkins, Miss Brahms by Niky Wardley, and Mr Rumbold by Justin Edwards. New characters introduced in the show included Young Mr Grace's grandson, also called Young Mr Grace, played by Mathew Horne; Miss Croft, named as a tribute to series co-creator David Croft, played by Jorgie Porter; and newcomer Mr Conway, played by Kayode Ewumi. The episode was written by Derren Litten. The BBC issued a press release saying: "It's 1988 and Young Mr Grace is determined to drag Grace Brothers into, well 1988, but he has a problem on his hands. Mr Humphries, Captain Peacock, Mr Rumbold and Mrs Slocombe all seem to be stuck in another era. A new member of staff, Mr Conway, joins the team but will he help shake things up or will he just put a pussy amongst the pigeons?"

The episode was aired in August 2016 to universally poor reviews for both the writing and the acting. No further episodes were commissioned.

Other adaptations

Spin-off

Almost immediately after the cancellation of Are You Being Served? in 1985, the cast began suggesting a spin-off to Jeremy Lloyd and David Croft. Though all felt the department store format was exhausted, it was suggested the characters could be moved to a new location. In 1992, most of the original cast reunited for Grace & Favour (known as Are You Being Served Again! in the United States and Canada). The new series followed the characters after Young Mr Grace's death, when they are forced to run a hotel in a dilapidated manor house that was purchased using their pension fund. Grace & Favour ran for two series.

Play
In the summer of 1976, a stage adaptation of Are You Being Served? ran at the Winter Gardens in Blackpool. Directed by Robert Redfarn. John Inman, Mollie Sugden, Frank Thornton, Wendy Richard, and Nicholas Smith reprised their characters from the television show while the characters of Mr Lucas, Mr Grainger, and Mr Mash were recast. The play had basically the same plot as the film version which would debut the next year, though Young Mr Grace's role was omitted entirely and Mr Mash had less to do than Mr Harman in the film. Reviews for the play were mixed; a writer for the Blackpool Diarist of the Stage declared it the funniest show he had seen in thirty years, while Michael Leapman from The Times declared the play to be worthless except for the final line, though he admitted he had never seen the television show. The play has occasionally been run at other theatres since.

American adaptation
In 1979, Garry Marshall, in the midst of success producing and directing Happy Days and its spin-offs, produced a pilot for an American version of Are You Being Served?, Beane's of Boston, remaking the episode, "German Week" for the television pilot. 

At the time, Americanised versions of British series, including Three's Company, All in the Family, and Sanford and Son were doing well in the ratings, and Marshall hoped to capitalise on this with his script for the production. 

Most of the characters were substantially similar to those of the UK version, with slight name changes in some instances.  The one significant difference was that the Rumbold character was replaced by “Franklin Beane” (George O’Hanlan, Jr.), the young nephew of the proprietor who has recently been put in charge of the department.

Jeremy Lloyd's Laugh-In partner, Alan Sues, was cast as Mr Humphries, a decision Lloyd regretted, saying Sues had been miscast. 

Other cast included future Magnum PI star John Hillerman as Mr Peacock, Charlotte Rae as Mrs Slocombe, Lorna Patterson as Miss Brahms, Tom Poston as Mr. Beane (the Mr. Grace equivalent), Larry Bishop as Mr. Lucas, Morgan Farley as Mr. Granger, and Don Bexley as Mr. Johnson (the Mash/Harman role).

Ultimately, CBS passed on Beane's of Boston and a full series was not produced.

Australian adaptation

An Australian adaptation, also called Are You Being Served?, ran for two series and sixteen episodes from 1980 to 1981 on Network Ten. It starred John Inman as Mr Humphries, who travels to Australia on loan from Grace Brothers to work for the Grace brothers' cousin, Mr Bone at his department store, Bone Brothers. The name Grace Brothers being the name of an actual department store chain founded in Sydney in 1885. Renamed versions of characters from the original series rounded out the cast including June Bronhill as Mrs Crawford, a copy of Mrs Slocombe, and Reg Gillam as Captain Wagstaff, a copy of Captain Peacock. Jeremy Lloyd adapted episodes for the show from his own scripts from the British Are You Being Served, drawing from the then-new episodes of the seventh series for series one of the Australian version, and a selection of older episodes for series two. Lloyd would later say he hated the process of adapting the episodes, which were mostly left intact with the exception of some topical jokes, which were changed or deleted.

Dutch specials
The TROS, the Dutch broadcaster that showed AYBS? in the Netherlands, invited over the key faces of the original cast twice to reprise their characters on Dutch television (albeit not for a full, half-hour episode). First in 1976, Dutch comedian André van Duin entered a shop and ran into Mr Humphries, Miss Brahms and Mrs Slocombe. A different special was made 1994, on the occasion of the 30 years jubilee of the TROS. This time, the search was for a replacement for Mrs Slocombe, with Mollie Sugden, John Inman, Frank Thornton, Wendy Richard, and Trevor Bannister all reprising their roles. In 1985 John Inman also assisted in character as co-presenter for a quiz.

Reception
The series gained much of its popularity with TV viewers by "pushing the envelope" through its deliberate-yet-subtle use of risqué visual gags, innuendo-infused dialogue and cleverly-disguised sophomoric humour. These comical devices also attracted some mild criticism, in part for relying on sexual stereotypes and double entendres – e.g., Mrs Slocombe discussing her cat: "Animals are very psychic; the least sign of danger and my pussy's hair stands on end".

John Inman's portrayal of Humphries' over-the-top antics and sharp-tongued, witty responses, along with his trademark catch-phrase "I'm free!", were enthusiastically embraced by many audience members, and the character evolved into a gay icon in popular culture.  Despite this, Inman pointed out that Mr Humphries' true sexual orientation was never explicitly stated in the series, and David Croft said in an interview that the character was not homosexual, but "just a mother's boy". In an episode of the spin-off Grace & Favour, the character is further described as neither a "woman's man" nor a "man's man" and as being "in limbo".

Merchandise
Seven early episodes were novelised for a book, written by Jeremy Lloyd, called Are You Being Served? – Camping in and other Fiascos. This was written in 1976, and republished in 1997 by KQED Books. The seven episodes featured are "Camping In", "Up Captain Peacock", "Wedding Bells", "His and Hers", "Coffee Morning", "The Hand of Fate" and "The Clock".

In 1995, KQED Books published Are You Being Served – The Inside Story by Adrian Rigelsford, Anthony Brown, and Geoff Tibbals, with a foreword by Jeremy Lloyd, and sub-titled: The Inside Story of Britain's Funniest – and Public Television's Favorite – Comedy Series. In 212 pages, the book's six chapters cover: The Cast of Characters, Behind the Scenes, The Episodes, The Spin-offs, Trivia Quiz, and Glossary. .

In 1999, I'm Free! The Complete Are You Being Served?, a guide to the series, was published by Orion Books. It was written by Richard Webber, with contributions from David Croft and Jeremy Lloyd.

A board game was also produced in the 1970s.  Players moved round a board resembling the shop floor to purchase one item from each of the four counters and leave the store, before their opponents and without going over budget.

DVD releases
All episodes exist in the BBC Archives. All ten series, including a black and white version of the pilot episode, and all five Christmas specials from those years, as well as both series of Grace & Favour are now available on DVD in the UK (Region 2). The Are You Being Served? film was released in 2002. A colour-restored version of the original pilot episode has yet to be released commercially.

All ten series, as well as both series of Grace & Favour (in packaging titled Are You Being Served? Again!) and the film are available on DVD in Region 1 (North America).

All ten series, as well as both series of Grace & Favour and the film have been released in Australia (Region 4).

A DVD titled Are You Being Served? – Best of The Early Years and Are You Being Served? Christmas Specials have also been released.

See also
 List of films based on British television series

Notes

References

External links

Are You Being Served? at the British Film Institute

Are You Being Served? Virtual Video Vault
Are You Being Served? Forever
The Grace Brothers' Multimedia Department
Are You Being Served? Central (Official site)

 
1972 British television series debuts
1985 British television series endings
1970s British sitcoms
1970s British workplace comedy television series
1970s LGBT-related sitcoms
1970s sex comedy television series
1980s British sitcoms
1980s British workplace comedy television series
1980s LGBT-related sitcoms
1980s sex comedy television series
BBC television sitcoms
Comedy Playhouse
David Croft sitcoms
Department stores in fiction
English-language television shows
Television shows set in London
Television shows adapted into films
Television shows adapted into novels
Television series by BBC Studios
Television series set in shops